The 2004 film The Aviator was nominated for eleven Academy Awards, and went on to win five, including Best Supporting Actress for Cate Blanchett. It also won the BAFTA Award for Best Film and Golden Globe Award for Best Motion Picture – Drama.

Organizations

Guilds

Critics groups

References

External links
 

Lists of accolades by film